Asuncion, officially the Municipality of Asuncion, is a 1st class municipality in the province of Davao del Norte, Philippines. According to the 2020 census, it has a population of 61,893 people.

History
The municipality of New Leyte was established on August 1, 1948 by combining the municipal districts of Saug and Camansa, pursuant to Executive Order No. 156 as signed by President Elpidio Quirino. The same year in September 13, New Leyte was renamed to Saug pursuant to Executive Order No. 173 signed once again by President Quirino, after its largest settlement which used to be one of the two municipal districts before the merger. Finally, Saug was once more renamed as Asuncion, named after Our Lady of the Assumption, pursuant to Republic Act No. 1675 approved on June 20, 1957.

In 1955, the barrio (barangay) of New Sabongan was transferred to the town of Compostela.

In 2004, Barangays Igangon, Kipalili, Sabangan, Sawata, Santo Niño, and Mamangan was transferred to the create municipality of San Isidro, Davao del Norte.

Geography

Climate

Barangays
Asuncion is politically subdivided into 20 barangays. Concepcion was elevated from being a sitio to a barrio in 1954. Del Pilar followed suit in 1957.

Demographics

Economy

See also
List of renamed cities and municipalities in the Philippines

References

External links
 Asuncion Profile at the DTI Cities and Municipalities Competitive Index
 [ Philippine Standard Geographic Code]
Philippine Census Information
Local Governance Performance Management System

Municipalities of Davao del Norte
Establishments by Philippine executive order